Robert David Silk  (born 23 August 1936) is an English priest of the Roman Catholic Church. He was formerly an Anglican bishop and was the Bishop of Ballarat in the Anglican Church of Australia.

Early life and education
Silk was born on 23 August 1936. He was educated at Gillingham Grammar School, Exeter University and St Stephen's House, Oxford.

Ordained ministry

Anglican ministry
Silk was ordained in the Church of England: made a deacon during Advent 1959 (20 December) by Robert Stannard, Dean of Rochester (and assistant bishop), at Rochester Cathedral, and ordained a priest the following Advent (18 December 1960), by Russell White, Bishop of Tonbridge, at Bexley (St Mary's) Parish Church. His first positions were curacies at St Barnabas' Gillingham and Holy Redeemer, Lamorbey. He then became the priest in charge of the Church of the Good Shepherd, Blackfen followed by incumbencies at Swanscombe and St George's Church, Beckenham (1975 to 1980). He was then appointed the Archdeacon of Leicester, a position he held until he was consecrated a bishop on 23 February 1994, by George Carey, Archbishop of Canterbury, at Westminster Abbey, and moved to Australia where he became the eighth bishop of the rural Diocese of Ballarat. On his return to England from Australia in 2003 he served for eighteen months as full-time parish priest of St Michael's, Amberley (with North Stoke, Parham, Wiggonholt, and Greatham) in Sussex, before retiring to Devon where he was an honorary assistant bishop in the Diocese of Exeter.

Roman Catholic ministry
Silk was received into the Roman Catholic Church in 2011. He was ordained to the diaconate in that church on 15 February 2011 and the priesthood on 18 February 2011. In June 2012, he was elevated to the rank of monsignor as a Chaplain of His Holiness.

Personal life
In 1957, Silk married Joyce Silk. They had two children; one son and one daughter.

References

1936 births
Anglican bishop converts to Roman Catholicism
People educated at Gillingham Grammar School, Kent
Alumni of the University of Exeter
Alumni of St Stephen's House, Oxford
Archdeacons of Leicester
Anglican bishops of Ballarat
20th-century Anglican bishops in Australia
21st-century Anglican bishops in Australia
Living people
Married Roman Catholic clergy